Your Morning is a Canadian breakfast television program that is broadcast on CTV and CTV News Channel. It debuted on August 22, 2016 and airs live from 6-9 a.m. in the Eastern Time Zone and simulcast elsewhere in Canada according to local scheduling.

The program is hosted by Anne-Marie Mediwake, along with contributors Lindsey Deluce (news anchor), and Kelsey McEwen (weather) from CTV's street-front studios at Bell Media Queen Street in Downtown Toronto.

History
The program was announced in June 2016 as the network's replacement for the network's long-running morning show, Canada AM, whose cancellation was announced the previous week. While Canada AM was produced at the network's 9 Channel Nine Court facility in Scarborough and was under the auspices of CTV News until October 2015, Your Morning is produced from the downtown Toronto studios at 299 Queen Street West, by Bell Media In-House Productions (later rebranded Bell Media Studios), the division responsible for CTV's daytime lifestyle programming including The Social and The Marilyn Denis Show.

Similarities to Canada AM include news reports, a weather segment (this time without additional local weather information after the segment), a cooking segment and occasional music performances. Like Canada AM, Your Morning is a 3-hour long program, with local news opt-outs every half-hour which may be filled by local CTV stations. Your Morning'''s Executive Producer is Jennifer MacLean, a former Senior Producer for Canada AM. The show's original production team included several producers who had previously worked on Canada AM, including Kristen Rynax, Paul Hughes, Katie Jamieson, Trish Bradley, Emily English, Tyler McFadden and Shannon Crown.Your Morning premiered on August 22, 2016 with Ben Mulroney and Anne-Marie Mediwake as cohosts. The first show included an interview with Prime Minister Justin Trudeau and a live music performance from American country music duo Florida Georgia Line.

As of September 2019, a portion of the program can now be seen live at 3 AM PT/5 AM CT on CTV's owned-and-operated stations in Western Canada, immediately followed by the local CTV Morning Live broadcasts. This means, for example, viewers watching CTV Winnipeg will see the first hour of Your Morning at 5 AM CT, followed by CTV Morning Live Winnipeg at 6 AM CT. Meanwhile, viewers in Vancouver can watch the first 2.5 hours of the program on CTV Vancouver starting at 3 AM PT, followed by CTV Morning Live Vancouver at 5:30 AM PT.

CTV's only affiliated station in Western Canada, CITL-DT Lloydminster, also broadcasts Your Morning on a tape delay from 6-9 AM MT.

Previously, as with Canada AM, the program was not broadcast on the western CTV O&O stations. It also did not air on three stations owned by Corus Entertainment which were affiliated with CTV from 2015 to 2018.

On October 1, 2021, Mulroney left the program and network in order to develop other projects.

Your Kids, Their Questions
On May 9, 2020, the Your Morning team produced and aired Your Kids, Their Questions: A Your Morning Coronavirus Special'', a one-hour prime time special educating children about issues around the COVID-19 pandemic in Canada. The special won the Canadian Screen Award for Best Children's or Youth Non-Fiction Program or Series at the 9th Canadian Screen Awards in 2021.

On-air staff

Current
 Anne-Marie Mediwake – Co-host (2016–present)
 Lindsey Deluce – News anchor (2016–present)
 Kelsey McEwen – Chief Meteorologist (2016–present)
 Melissa Grelo – Entertainment (2016–present)
 Radheyan Simonpillai – Film critic
 Jessica Smith – Weather specialist (2021–present)
 Sonia Mangat - Weather Specialist

Former
 Ben Mulroney – Co-host (2016-2021)
 Priya Sam (2018-2019)
 Brandon Gonez (2017-2019)
 Michelle Jobin – Weather specialist

References

Television morning shows in Canada
CTV Television Network original programming
2016 Canadian television series debuts
CTV News
Television series by Bell Media
Television shows filmed in Toronto
2010s Canadian television talk shows
2020s Canadian television talk shows
2010s Canadian television news shows
2020s Canadian television news shows
Canadian Screen Award-winning television shows